Lev Nikolayevich Kekushev was a Russian architect, notable for his Art Nouveau buildings in Moscow, built in the 1890s and early 1900s in the original, Franco-Belgian variety of this style. Kekushev's buildings are notable for his skillful use of metal ornaments and his signature with a lion (Lev) ornament or sculpture.

Biography

Education
Kekushev was born in the family of a Russian officer in Vilnius (Maria Naschokina, p. 253; Simbirsk according to other sources). Kekushev graduated high school in Vilnius, and the Institute of Civil Engineers in Saint Petersburg (1883–1889). For one year, he worked as a state-employed construction engineer in Saint Petersburg, but relocated to Moscow in 1890. At first an assistant to architect Semyon Eybushits, he started independent practice in 1893. At the same time, Kekushev became a master in applied art technologies - iron forging, silver galvanization and chemical frosting of glass. Throughout the 1890s, Kekushev and Illarion Ivanov-Shitz were employed by Moscow-based railway companies and designed dozens of extant railway stations.

Art Nouveau

Kekushev was the first practitioner of Art Nouveau in Moscow, starting with his apartment buildings in Varsonofyevskay Lane and Bolshaya Dmitrovka, completed 1893. His style (unlike the next generation of Art Nouveau architects like William Walcot and Fyodor Schechtel) is very close to the original Belgian style of Victor Horta. The new wave of architecture was endorsed and financed by prominent business figures like the Khludov and Morozov families and Jacob Reck.

In 1898–1899, Kekushev won the first prize in the open contest for Hotel Metropol; financier Savva Morozov discarded the decision of a professional jury and awarded architectural design to William Walcot. However, the owners retained Kekushev as overall project manager. "None of this (Walcot's earlier) work is on the scale of the Metropole; Kekushev's assistance was probably crucial to the final realization of this complex structure, with its immense dome of glass and iron over an interior court" (Brumfield, chapter 3). 

Kekushev's talent and recognition peaked in 1900–1903, when Art Nouveau, for a while, became the dominant style in Moscow. His buildings include such diverse luxury residences as the timber-framed Nosov House (Electrozavodskaya Street) and stone and steel Mindovsky House (44 Povarskaya Street, now Embassy of New Zealand - a part of a large affluent community developed by Jacob Reck). Kekushev, skilled in interior finishes, practiced Gesamtkunstwerk approach, designing interiors down to the smallest details. Unlike other architects, who commissioned artwork finishes to independent artists, all Kekushev buildings have distinct Kekushev metal ornaments.

Withdrawal from practice

After the Russian revolution of 1905, when public opinion "dismissed Art Nouveau as ephemera of fashion" (Brumfield, chapter 3) in favor of Neoclassical revival, Kekushev was unwilling or unable to change, and worked on low-profile, unimportant projects. By 1912 he practically disappeared from professional scene.

Maria Naschokina, a historian of Art Nouveau, suggested that Kekushev's withdrawal was actually caused by unspecified (probably, mental) illness; this statement has not been thoroughly proved. Kekushev's last years remain a mystery; even the year of his death is disputed (1916 to 1919).

Nikolay Kekushev
The architect's son, Nikolay Kekushev, was a famous aviator who saw combat in 1924 in Central Asia, later working as aircraft engineer on Arctic flights in the 1920s and 1930s. He was a member of Pavel Golovin's air crew that was the first to reach the North Pole on May 5, 1937, in preparation for Ivan Papanin's polar expedition. During World War II, he flew 59 missions on a DC-3 to and from besieged Leningrad, evacuating starving residents; later, he served on anti-submarine Arctic patrols. In 1948 Nikolay Kekushev was arrested, and he spent six years in Dzhezkazgan labor camps. He survived and wrote a book of memoirs, Zveriada; however, it does not reveal much about his father's last years.

Selected buildings

Assistant to Semyon Eybuschits
 1890-1893 - Central Public Baths
 1890-1893 - Okhotny Ryad redevelopment

Assistant to Sergey Tikhomirov
 1890-1893 - Apartment Building of Gregory the Theosof Church, Bolshaya Dmitrovka Street

Own practice
 1892–1899 I.N.Geyer Almshouse, 15 Verkhaya Krasnoselskaya, photographs
 1893 — Gagarin Apartment Building, Varsonofievsky Lane (partly destroyed by facadist "reconstruction" in 2000s)
 1894–1895 — Korobkov House, Pyatnitskaya Street (with Sergey Shutzman)
 1894–1896 — Khludov Apartment Building,
 1898–1900 — Grachev Estate, Khovrino, now 77 Festivalnaya Street, Moscow, modelled after casino in Monte-Carlo by Charles Garnier
 1898–1899 — Gustav List House, 8 Glazovsky Lane, with William Walcot mosaic frieze. Kekushev started this building for himself, but halfway into construction, List offered him the bounty Kekushev could not resist.
 1898–1899 — Odintsovo rail station
 1899 — Nekrasov Building, 4 Gogol Boulevard
 1899–1900 — Saarbekov House, Povarskaya Street
 1899–1900 — Iberian Trade Rows, Nikolskaya Street
 1900–1903 — Own house, 21 Ostozhenka Street (also known as Kekysheva House, as he had to give it to his ex-wife in settling their divorce)
 1902–1921 — Gogol Boulevard
 1903 — Nosov House, Electrozavodskaya Street
 1903 — Mindovsky House, 44 Povarskaya Street (Embassy of New Zealand) interior photographs
 1903–1904 — Ponizovsky House, 42 Povarskaya Street (Embassy of Afghanistan)
 1898–1907 — construction manager for Hotel Metropol (Moscow), lead architect: William Walcot
 1904–1906 — Isakov Apartment Building, 28 Prechistenka Street
 1906 — Railway stations of Moscow-Yaroslavl railroad
 1906 — Interiors, Praga Restaurant (Arbat Square) and Morozov House (Prechistenka Street)
 1910 — expansion of Yaroslavsky Rail Terminal
 1911 — Rudnev Hospital, Serebryany Lane
 1912 — Hospital near Preobrazhenskoye Cemetery

References
William Craft Brumfield, "The Origins of Modernism in Russian Architecture", University of California Press, 1991 contents chapter 3
Embassy of New Zealand in Moscow homepage 
Russian: List of publications by Kekushev: www.snor.ru
Russian: Nikolay Kekushev's book: Кекушев, Н.Л., "Звериада", М, 1991 online text and biography in Russian
Russian: Нащокина, Мария, "Архитекторы московского модерна", М, "Жираф", 2005, стр.236-253 (Maria Naschokina)
Russian: Нащокина, Мария Владимировна. Московский архитектор Лев Кекушев / Рос. Акад. Архитектуры и строит. наук, НИИ теории и истории архитектуры и градостроительства. СПб., Коло, 2012, 

Architects from the Russian Empire
Art Nouveau architects
1862 births
1916 deaths
Saint-Petersburg State University of Architecture and Civil Engineering alumni